Rosedale is an unincorporated community in Russell County, Virginia, United States. The community was founded in 1819. Rosedale has a post office with ZIP code 24280, which opened on February 26, 1897. Rosedale was named for the area's Rosedale Plantation; the plantation was either named after the couple that owned the property or named for a "rose valley". The community has also been known as Elway and Oaks Garage, the latter name coming from a service station in the settlement.

Smithfield was listed on the National Register of Historic Places in 1994.

References

Unincorporated communities in Russell County, Virginia
Unincorporated communities in Virginia
Populated places established in 1819